Ayman Kari (born 19 November 2004) is a French professional footballer who plays as a midfielder for  club Lorient, on loan from Paris Saint-Germain.

Early life 
Born in Ivry-sur-Seine, Île-de-France, Kari first played youth club football in Villejuif. He then joined the Paris Saint-Germain Academy in 2017, after spending two years in the pre-academy with the club.

Club career 
Having started playing with the under-19 side of Paris Saint-Germain (PSG) in the summer of 2021, impressing both in the Championnat National U19 and the UEFA Youth League, Kari was elected Titi d'Or in 2021, making him the best youth player of that year, above the likes of Xavi Simons, Djeidi Gassama or Ismaël Gharbi. Kari extended his contract with PSG in July 2022, tying him to the club until 2024, after he was announced as a likely Bayern Munich recruit.

On 5 January 2023, Kari signed his first professional contract with PSG, a deal until 30 June 2025. On 31 January, he was loaned out to fellow Ligue 1 club Lorient until the end of the season with an option for a one-year extension. Although the deal also includes an option-to-buy for Lorient, according to various media reports, PSG should also hold a buy-back clause in the case of Kari being sold.

International career 
Kari is a youth international for France, having started playing with the French under-18 in the autumn of 2021. He is also eligible to represent Comoros and Madagascar at international level.

Style of play 
A polyvalent midfielder, Kari mainly played as a sentinelle, a deep-lying playmaker, during his time under Zoumana Camara with PSG youth teams.

He is described as a hard-working player, good at pressing and getting the ball back, with great pace, then able to make good use of the ball, with a controlled and decisive game.

Career statistics

Honours 
Individual
 Titi d'Or: 2021

References

External links

2004 births
Living people
French footballers
France youth international footballers
French sportspeople of Comorian descent
French sportspeople of Malagasy descent
Association football midfielders
Sportspeople from Ivry-sur-Seine
Footballers from Val-de-Marne
Paris Saint-Germain F.C. players
FC Lorient players